The Toronto East Detention Centre, often simply referred to as The East, is a remand facility located in Toronto, Ontario, Canada. It is located at 55 Civic Road adjacent to the southwest of Eglinton Avenue and Birchmount Road in the former city of Scarborough. The facility was known as the Metropolitan Toronto East Detention Centre until the Metropolitan Municipality of Toronto was amalgamated in 1998.

It is notably mentioned in the song "Informer" by Canadian reggae fusion artist Snow, becoming one of the biggest hit singles of 1993.

See also 
List of correctional facilities in Ontario

References

 Ontario Ministry of Community Safety and Correctional Services

Prisons in Ontario
Buildings and structures in Scarborough, Toronto
1977 establishments in Ontario